State Road 107 (NM 107) is a  state highway located entirely within Socorro County in the U.S. state of New Mexico. NM 107's southern terminus is at NM 1 southwest of the City of Socorro, and the northern terminus is at U.S. Route 60 (US 60) in the community of Magdalena.

Major intersections

See also

References

107
Transportation in Socorro County, New Mexico